"Some Heads Are Gonna Roll" is a song by the English heavy metal band Judas Priest. It was originally released on their 1984 studio album, Defenders of the Faith, and issued as a single later that year.

Background
"Some Heads Are Gonna Roll" was included on The Best of Judas Priest: Living After Midnight, which was not endorsed by the band. The tune itself was composed by Bob Halligan Jr., of the band Ceili Rain.

The first half of the guitar solo is played by Glenn Tipton and the second half is played by K. K. Downing.

The EP's B-side is a live version of "The Green Manalishi (With the Two Prong Crown)", recorded at the US Festival, Glen Helen Park, near Devore, San Bernardino in California on 29 May 1983 in front of an audience of approximately 375,000 people. It also includes the studio version of "Jawbreaker" from the Defenders of the Faith album.

The song was on the 2001 Clear Channel memorandum banned songs-list after 9/11.

The song was also the inspiration behind the Dokken song "Into the Fire" with George Lynch stating in a 2010 interview that he had "ripped them off".

Covers
"Some Heads Are Gonna Roll" was covered by American rock band Fight or Flight on the deluxe edition of their debut album, A Life by Design?.

Personnel
Rob Halford – vocals
K. K. Downing – guitar
Glenn Tipton – guitar
Ian Hill – bass
Dave Holland – drums

Charts

References

1984 singles
Judas Priest songs
Songs written by Bob Halligan Jr.
1984 songs
Columbia Records singles